Glimmerati is a 2005 racing video game developed by Bugbear Entertainment and published by Nokia for the Nokia N-Gage.

Story
In the game's story, the player is a wealthy heir who meets with another wealthy man one day, and he admires the player's skill in driving. He invites the player to compete with Club Glimmerati, an exclusive gathering of famous and rich people who race in the public streets for fun.

Reception

Glimmerati received "favorable" reviews according to the review aggregation website Metacritic.

References

External links
 

Racing video games
N-Gage games
Video games developed in Finland
2005 video games
Bugbear Entertainment games
Nokia games